Niña (Spanish for girl) is a given name, nickname and surname of Spanish origin. Notable people with this name include the following:

Niña Corpuz (born 1977), Filipino broadcast journalist
Niña Dolino (born 1982), Filipino actress
Niña Jose, nickname of Mary Claire José (born 1988), Filipino actress.
Niña Pastori, stage name of María Rosa García García (born 1978) Spanish singer
Niña van Dijk (born 1985), member of Treble (musical group)

See also

Nia (given name)
Nika (given name)
Nima (name)
Nina (name)
Niño (name)
Nipa (disambiguation)
Nita (given name)
Niwa (disambiguation)